Tasmanian Networks Pty Limited, trading as TasNetworks, is a Tasmanian Government State owned company that is responsible for electricity transmission and distribution throughout Tasmania. It also owns and operates a telecommunications network throughout the state.

TasNetworks is a participant in the Australian National Electricity Market (NEM) that operates an interconnected power system that extends from Queensland to South Australia. Tasmania is connected to the NEM via the Basslink interconnector, which is a  HVDC submarine cable.

TasNetworks is a regulated monopoly that receives its revenue cap from the Australian Energy Regulator. The company has two shareholders, the Minister for Energy and the Treasurer of Tasmania. TasNetworks was formed on 1 July 2014, following the merger of the transmission company Transend Networks, which disbanded, and the distribution division of Aurora Energy; which became a retail-only business.

See also

List of Tasmanian government agencies

References

External links
TasNetworks

Companies based in Tasmania
Companies established in 2014
Electric power transmission system operators in Australia
Electric power distribution network operators in Australia
Government-owned companies of Tasmania
Electric power monopolies
2014 establishments in Australia